Asadollah Asadi (born 1972) is the third diplomat of the Iranian embassy in Austria. He was arrested while returning to his residence in Austria on a highway in the German state of Bavaria on June 10, 2018, accused of being involved in an attempted bombing at a gathering of the National Council of Resistance of Iran (a political organisation opposing the Iranian regime) in Villepinte, north of Paris. While Asadi was entitled to diplomatic immunity in the country of his posting, Austria, he did not have political immunity on German soil, although Iran objected, saying that it regarded the detention of Assadollah Assadi as unlawful and a violation of international law and the provisions of the 1961 Vienna Convention.

Belgian judicial authorities said that Asadi, along with two others, Nasim Naami (33 نسیم نعامی) and Amir Saadoni (امیر سعدونی 38), were suspects.

Iranian Minister of Foreign Affairs Javad Zarif tweeted:
How surprising it is that at the same time as our (Iranian delegation) traveled to Europe with the President of Iran, Iran's alleged operation was launched and one person was arrested. Iran explicitly condemns violence and terrorism everywhere and is ready to address any concerns in this regard.

Asadi, Naami, Saadoni, and Mehrdad Arefani were put on trial by a Belgian court. On 4 February 2021, Asadi was sentenced to 20 years in prison for “attempted murder and involvement in terrorism.” During the trial it emerged that the high-potential bomb used for the attack was transported inside a diplomatic suitcase, and that the official, based in Vienna, left the diplomatic headquarters 289 times in order to travel around Europe.

A lawyer for the prosecution commented after the trial "The ruling shows two things: a diplomat doesn't have immunity for criminal acts ... and the responsibility of the Iranian state in what could have been carnage."

See also 
 Iranian diplomat terror plot trial
 Iran and state-sponsored terrorism
 Ahmad Reza Djalali
 Trial of Hamid Nouri

Footnotes 

Iranian diplomats
Living people
1972 births